This is a list of towns, villages and most notable hamlets and neighbourhoods in Surrey, a ceremonial and administrative county of England.

For lists relating to parts of London formerly in Surrey, see the London Boroughs of Croydon, Kingston upon Thames (Royal Borough), Richmond upon Thames, Lambeth, Merton, Southwark, Sutton and Wandsworth.  Some of these parts of the historic county lay, until its 1996 official disestablishment, in a fourth definition of Surrey: the postal county.

Bordering counties, west to east, are Berkshire, Hampshire, West Sussex, Greater London, East Sussex and Kent.

A

Abinger, Addlestone, Albury, Alfold, Artington, Ash, Ash Vale, Ashford, Ashtead
Abbotswood in Guildford
Abinger Common and Abinger Hammer in Abinger
Ashford Common in Ashford
Ambleside in Walton-on-Thames
Ashley Park in Walton-on-Thames

B
Badshot Lea, Bagshot, Banstead, Betchworth, Bisley, Bletchingley, Bookham (Great and Little), Box Hill, Bramley, Brockham, Brookwood, Buckland, Burgh Heath, Burpham, Burstow, Busbridge, Byfleet
Beacon Hill in Haslemere
Beare Green in Capel
Bellfields in Guildford
Birtley Green in Bramley
Blackheath in Wonersh
Blindley Heath in Godstone
Broadford in Chobham
Brook in Wormley
Brooklands in Weybridge
Brookwood Heath in Brookwood
Burntcommon in Send
Burwood Park in Hersham and Walton-on-Thames

C

Camberley, Capel, Caterham, Chaldon, Charlwood, Chertsey, Chiddingfold, Chilworth, Chipstead, Chobham, Churt, Claygate, Cobham, Compton (Borough of Guildford), Compton (Waverley), Cranleigh
Caterham on the Hill and Caterham Valley in Caterham
Castle End in Egham
Castle Green in Chobham
Catteshall in Godalming
Charlotteville in Guildford
Charlton in Shepperton
Coldharbour in Newdigate
Cooper's Hill in Englefield Green
Cudworth in Newdigate

D
Deepcut, Dockenfield (part), Dorking, Dormansland, Downside, Dunsfold

E

East Clandon, East Horsley, East Molesey, Effingham, Egham, Ellen's Green, Elstead, Englefield Green, Epsom, Esher, Ewell, Ewhurst
Earlswood in Redhill
East Ewell in Ewell
Egham Hythe in Egham
Effingham Junction in Effingham
Enton in Witley
Enton Green in Enton

F
Farnham, Felbridge, Felcourt, Fetcham, Frensham, Frimley, Frimley Green
Fairlands in Worplesdon
Fairmile in Cobham
Farley Green in Albury
Farncombe in Godalming
Flexford in Normandy
Forest Green in Abinger
Friday Street in Wotton
Frith Hill in Godalming

G
Godalming, Godstone, (Great) Bookham, Guildford
Gatwick in Shackleford
Givons Grove in Leatherhead
Goldsworth Park in Woking
Gomshall in Shere
Grafham in Bramley
Guildford Park in Guildford

H
Hale, Hambledon, Hascombe, Haslemere, Headley, Hersham, Hinchley Wood, Hooley, Horne, Horley, Horsell, Hydestile 
Hamm Court in Addlestone
Heath End in Farnham
Heatherside in Camberley
Hindhead in Haslemere
Holland in Oxted
Holmbury St Mary in Shere
Hook Heath in Woking
Hookwood in Horley
Hurst Green in Oxted
Hurst Park in West Molesey
Hurtmore in Shackleford

J
Jacobs Well

K
Kingswood
Kempton Park in Sunbury
Knaphill in Woking

L
Laleham, Leatherhead, Leigh, Lightwater, Limpsfield, Lingfield, Little Bookham, Littleton, Long Ditton, Longcross, Lyne
Langley Vale in Epsom
Leigh Corner in Cobham
Littleton in Artington
Lower Bourne in Farnham
Lower Green, Esher
Lower Halliford in Upper Halliford
Lower Kingswood in Kingswood
Lower Sunbury in Sunbury-on-Thames

M
Mayford, Merrow, Merstham, Mickleham, Milford, Molesey (East and West), Mytchett
Martyrs Green in Ockham
Maybury in Woking
Meadvale in Reigate and Redhill
Meath Green in Horley
Mimbridge in Chobham
Mount Herman in Woking

N
Newdigate, New Haw, Nork, Normandy, North Holmwood, Nutfield
Netherne-on-the-Hill in Hooley
Newchapel in Horne
Norney in Shackleford
New Malden in Horne

O
Oakwoodhill, Oatlands, Ockham, Ockley, Ottershaw, Outwood, Oxshott, Oxted
Old Merstham in Merstham
Old Shepperton in Shepperton
Old Woking in Woking
Onslow Village in Guildford

P
Peper Harrow, Pirbright, Pixham, Puttenham, Pyrford
Pachesham in Leatherhead
Park Barn in Guildford
Peaslake in Shere
Peasmarsh in Shalford
Pennypot in Chobham
Pitch Place in Guildford
Povey Cross in Horley

R
Redhill, Reigate, Ripley, Rowledge
Ranmore Common in Effingham
Row Town in Addlestone
Rydeshill in Guildford

S
Salfords, Seale, Send, Shackleford, Shalford, Shepperton, Shere, South Nutfield, Staines-upon-Thames, Stanwell, Stoke D'Abernon, Stoneleigh (part), Sunbury-on-Thames, Sutton Green
Sandown Park in Esher
Send Marsh in Send
Shamley Green in Wonersh
Sheerwater in Woking
Shottermill in Haslemere
Slyfield in Guildford
Smallfield in Burstow
Smithbrook in Bramley
South Godstone in Godstone
St George's Hill in Weybridge, Hersham & Walton-on-Thames
St John's (Redhill)
St John's (Woking)
Stanwell Moor in Stanwell
Stoke in Guildford
Stoughton in Guildford
Stroude in Virginia Water

T
Tadworth, Tandridge, Tatsfield, Thames Ditton, Thorpe, Thursley, Tilford, Titsey, Tongham
Thorncombe Street in Bramley
Tattenham Corner in Banstead
Tekels Park in Camberley (previously called Frimley Park until it is said lost in a card game)
The Acres in Horley
The Sands in Seale
The Wells in Epsom
Trumps Green in Virginia Water
Thorpe in Thorpe

U
Upper Halliford
Upper Bourne in Farnham
Upper Kingswood or Kingswood in Kingswood

V
Virginia Water

W
Walton-on-Thames, Walton-on-the-Hill, Wanborough, Warlingham, West Byfleet, West Clandon, West Horsley, West Molesey, Westhumble, West End, Westcott, Weybourne, Weybridge, Whitebushes, Whyteleafe, Windlesham, Wisley, Witley, Woking, Woldingham, Wonersh, Woodham, Woodmansterne, Wood Street Village, Wormley, Worplesdon, Wotton, Wrays, Wrecclesham
Walliswood in Abinger
Wentworth in Virginia Water
Westborough in Guildford
West End in Esher
West Ewell in Ewell
Westfield in Woking
Weston Green in Thames Ditton
Whiteley Village in Hersham
Willey Green in Normandy
Wonersh Common in Wonersh
Woodbridge Hill in Guildford
Woodhatch in Reigate
Wray Common in Reigate and Redhill
Wyke in Normandy

References

External links
Map of places in Surrey compiled from this list

Surrey
 
Places